Manuele Mori (born 8 September 1980 in Empoli) is an Italian former professional road bicycle racer, who rode professionally between 2002 and 2019 for the ,  and  teams. He won the Japan Cup in 2007.

Major results

2001
 3rd Gran Premio di Poggiana
2003
 1st Gran Premio di Poggiana
 1st Stage 1 Giro della Toscana Under-23
 6th Gran Premio Industrie del Marmo
 6th Ruota d'Oro
2004
 9th Paris–Brussels
 10th Gran Premio Bruno Beghelli
2005
 3rd Memorial Cimurri
 4th Road race, National Road Championships
 5th Japan Cup
 6th Coppa Sabatini
 6th Giro del Piemonte
 10th Milan–San Remo
2006
 3rd GP Ouest–France
 4th Giro del Piemonte
 5th Gran Premio Bruno Beghelli
 5th GP Miguel Induráin
 6th Japan Cup
 9th Coppa Placci
 10th Vattenfall Cyclassics
2007
 1st Japan Cup
 3rd Memorial Cimurri
 4th Monte Paschi Eroica
 9th GP Ouest–France
 10th Coppa Sabatini
2008
 6th Trofeo Pollença
 8th Gran Premio Bruno Beghelli
 10th GP Ouest–France
2009
 9th Rund um die Nürnberger Altstadt
 10th Coppa Ugo Agostoni
2010
 7th Giro della Toscana
 9th Overall Tirreno–Adriatico
2011
 6th Japan Cup
 7th Gran Premio Nobili Rubinetterie
2013
 2nd Gran Premio Bruno Beghelli
 6th Japan Cup
2014
 7th Overall Tour of Hainan
2016
 4th Japan Cup
 4th Memorial Marco Pantani
 9th Overall Czech Cycling Tour

Grand Tour general classification results timeline

References

External links

Italian male cyclists
Sportspeople from the Metropolitan City of Florence
1980 births
Living people
Cyclists from Tuscany
People from Empoli